D21 was an , north–south state road in Istria County, Croatia. A short section of D21 was a part of the European route E751. The northern terminus of the route was located at the Croatia–Slovenia border at the Dragonja River. There it connected to Koper, Slovenia, and Trieste, Italy, via the Slovene route G11 further north. The route was generally parallel to A9 motorway, with which it formed several junctions, either directly or via short connectors, at Buje, Bale and Vodnjan – towns served directly by D21. The southern terminus of the route was found in the city of Pula, at the southern tip of the Istrian Peninsula.

The road, as well as all other state roads in Croatia, was managed and maintained by Hrvatske ceste, a state-owned company. The road carried an annual average daily traffic of about 2,000 vehicles, and the traffic volume increased by up to 1,000 vehicles in summer as the road was used by tourists in the region. The southernmost portion of the road was significantly more congested as it carries Pula suburban traffic.

In classical antiquity, the western Istria route was first used by Via Flavia in the classical antiquity, but the roads in the area declined in the Middle Ages and subsequent division of the Istrian Peninsula by the Republic of Venice and the Habsburg Empire was not conductive to development of a road system. In the 19th century, the First French Empire started road construction, including the Trieste–Pula route now largely followed by D21. The route was a part of M2 Adriatic Highway route after the Second World War. It was made a separate state road and assigned the D21 route number in 1997. In 2013, the road was abolished because of the creation of parallel D75 road, located west of the A9 motorway.

Route description

D21 was an  state road situated in Istria County following a general north–south alignment. Most of the route ran through predominantly agricultural land and small settlements, except the route segment between Bale and Baderna, where the road was predominantly surrounded by forests. The southernmost  of the route ran through suburbs of Pula – the largest city in the region. D21 extended south from the Kaštel border crossing between Croatia and Slovenia situated at the Dragonja River. To the north of the D21 terminus, the route – a part of the European route E751 – connected the cities of Koper, Slovenia, and Trieste, Italy, via G11 in Slovenia.

The first section of the D21 route followed an overall eastern orientation.

Just to the north of Kaštel, D21 turned south before proceeding to the town of Buje located about  down the road from Kaštel. In Buje, D21 forms at-grade intersections with D200 and D300. D200 provides a route to the Plovanija border crossing with Slovenia and D300 to the town of Umag and Umag interchange of A9 motorway. There are also at-grade intersections with the Ž5007 and Ž5008 county roads in the town. There D21 formed a roundabout junction at the north bank of the river. The roundabout connected D21 to D44, which links the town of Buzet to the east, and to D301 which links the town of Novigrad and another A9 interchange to the west.

The intersection is built as a partial cloverleaf interchange.

D21 turned southwest at the Lim embayment of the Adriatic Sea after another . At that point, D21 formed an at-grade intersection with Ž5002 road to Vrsar situated further west. Following the Ž5002 junction, D21 turns southeast to follow the contours of the Lim embayment valley. D303, in turn, links to the Kanfanar interchange of the A9 motorway and the coastal city of Rovinj.

South of the D303 intersection, D21 ran south along a generally flat terrain and consisted of relatively straight sections compared to the northern parts of the route. South of Bale, D21 turns southeast and approaches Vodnjan. It reaches a short connector to the Vodnjan-sjever (north) interchange of the A9 motorway  down the road.

After another , D21 reached Vodnjan and the Ž5192 road junction connecting to Fažana. There are two further significant junctions of D21 in the next  – one with Ž5190 to Svetvinčenat and the other with the Vodnjan-jug (south) interchange of A9. Within Pula, D21 route formed an at-grade junction with the Ž5115 road to Fažana about  further along. The junction also serves the Brijuni National Park. The southern terminus of the route is found at a roundabout  further south, where D21 connected to D400.

History

In classical antiquity, the Via Flavia road built by the emperor Vespasian in 78 AD ran through the same area spanned by modern D21. The Via Flavia followed a north–south route in the western part of the Istrian Peninsula, connecting Tergeste, present-day Trieste, to Pula via Poreč. In Pula, the Roman road extended further to the northeast to Nesactium and Tarsatica – modern-day Trsat area of the city of Rijeka.

Following the decline of the Roman Empire, roads in the region deteriorated. Only the Via Sclavonica is known to have existed in the region by year 1030. It was an east–west route spanning from Pazin to Poreč. Road transport in the region lost significance after the peninsula was divided between the Habsburg monarchy and the Republic of Venice. From 1809–1813, the Trieste–Pula route was rebuilt by the First French Empire, after the French captured the entire region from Venice and the Habsburgs. Upgrades to the regional road network continued after the Austrian Empire acquired Istria at the 1814–1815 Congress of Vienna. By 1830, the road network in Istria had expanded to a degree that would not change for a century and a half. The only significant improvement of region's roads was paving of the Trieste–Pula road in 1930s.

During the Second World War all the roads in Istria sustained significant damage. After the war the road became a part of the Adriatic Highway – a trunk road tracing the Adriatic Sea coast within the SFR Yugoslavia, signposted as M2 route. The next major addition to the road network on the peninsula was completion of the first section of the Istrian Y expressway in 1981. The system was designed to replace M2 route as the main road route in Istria. The Yugoslav M2 designation was retained after the independence of Croatia, until 1997, when the part of the Adriatic Highway spanning the Slovene border and Pula was designated as state road D21. Since October 1991, Hrvatske ceste, a company owned by the Government of Croatia, has been tasked with maintenance of the road. In 2013, following a new classification, the coastal county roads were classified as D75 state road and thus, D21 lost on its importance and was declassified. The present-day route of the D21 consist of short,  section of D510,  section of Ž5209 county road, forming its northern half and  section of D75, forming its southern half.

Traffic volume
Volume of traffic flowing along D21 road was measured by Hrvatske ceste at six traffic counting stations distributed along the route. Three of the traffic counting stations work continuously, while the rest of them are operated intermittently. By 2002, the road lost a significant portion of its north–south traffic as A9 motorway was gradually extended since 1991, running parallel to the route. At the Kaštel traffic counting site, the average summer traffic volume declined from 12,564 vehicles per day recorded in 2002, to just 2,989 vehicles in 2011.

Major intersections
The entire route is in Istria County.

Sources: Public roads classification and Regulation on motorway markings in Croatia

Sources

D021
D021